Toine is a Dutch given name and a nickname with both masculine and feminine uses. It is a short form of Antoine and a diminutive form of Antonius, Anton, Antoon, Anthonis, Anthoon, Antonie, and Antonis used in Belgium, Netherlands, Suriname, South Africa, Namibia, and Indonesia. Notable people with this name include the following:

Given name
Toine Hezemans (born 1943), Dutch racing car driver
Toine Manders (born 1956), Dutch politician (Member of the European Parliament)
Toine Manders (politician, born 1969), Dutch politician (Libertarian Party leader)
Toine van Huizen (born 1990), Dutch professional footballer
Toine van Peperstraten (born 1967), Dutch sports journalist

Nickname
Toine Burks, nickname of Gregory Burks (born 1980), American basketball player
Toine van Mierlo, nickname of Antonius Wilhelmus Matthias Theodore van Mierlo (born 1957), Dutch footballer 
Toine van Renterghem, nickname of Antoine François Mathieu van Renterghem (1885 – 1967), Dutch footballer

See also

Taine (disambiguation)
Tine (disambiguation)
Toinen, song
Tone (disambiguation)
Tonie
Tonne (name)
Towne (disambiguation)
Trine (disambiguation)
Twine (disambiguation)

References

Nicknames
Dutch feminine given names
Dutch masculine given names